Francisco Park is a public park in the Russian Hill neighborhood in San Francisco, California. It opened on April 27, 2022 and was the largest public park established in the city in over 40 years.

History
The location of the park was established as a reservoir, named the Francisco Reservoir, in 1860. This reservoir was decommissioned in 1940, following the establishment of the Lombard Street Reservoir. The property then sat unused until 2014, when the city Board of Supervisors voted to hand over the property from the utility district to the city's Recreation and Parks Department. The park was then built by Francisco Park Conservancy, a nonprofit organization supported by the donations from the neighbors and community and finally gifted to the City in 2022.

Amenities

The park has a large lawn, a community garden, picnic tables, a public restroom, and seating areas. The park is ADA-accessible.

References

Parks in San Francisco
Russian Hill, San Francisco